Blackford might refer to:

People with the surname
Charles Minor Blackford (1833–1903), an American lawyer
Hosea Blackford, a fictional character in books by Harry Turtledove
Ian Blackford, a Scottish politician
Isaac Blackford (1786–1859), an American judge and politician
Richard Blackford (born 1954), an English composer
Russell Blackford, an Australian writer, philosopher, and critic
Steven Blackford (1977–2004), an American wrestler

Places
Australia
Blackford, South Australia
United Kingdom
Blackford, Cumbria, England
Blackford, Somerset, England
Blackford, Edinburgh, Scotland
Blackford Hill
Blackford Pond
Blackford, Perth and Kinross, Scotland
United States
Blackford, Kentucky
Blackford County, Indiana

Other uses
Blackford Oakes, the fictional protagonist in a series of books by William F. Buckley, Jr.

See also
Baron Blackford
Blackford High School (disambiguation)